Events in the year 2021 in Sudan.

Incumbents 

 Chairman of the Sovereignty Council: Abdel Fattah al-Burhan
 Prime Minister: Abdalla Hamdok
 Deputy Chairman of the Sovereignty Council: Mohamed Hamdan Dagalo

Events 
Ongoing – War in Darfur, COVID-19 pandemic in Sudan

January and February
January 3 – Sudan, Egypt, and Ethiopia agree to hold further talks this month to resolve their dispute over the Grand Ethiopian Renaissance Dam on the Blue Nile.
January 6 – Sudan and the United States sign the Abraham Accords opening a path to normalization of Sudanese-Israeli relations and settling the debt with the World Bank.
January 16 – Fighting between Masalit people and Arab nomads in Al Geneina District leaves 84 dead and 160 wounded, including soldiers. This is two weeks after the United Nations withdrew its peacekeepers from West Darfur.
January 17 – The death toll in weekend fighting goes to 130 in West Darfur and dozens in South Darfur. At least 50,000 people are displaced.
January 19 – Tensions rise along the border between Sudan and Ethiopia days after Sudan accused Ethiopia of violating its airspace. South Sudan has offered to mediate.
January 20 – No injuries or damage reported in an attack on Governor Mohammed Abdalla al-Douma's residence in Geneina, West Darfur.
January 24 – Police fire tear gas at dozens of people protesting about the economy in Khartoum; similar protests were held in Omdurman. Inflation reached 269% in December and Sudan has a debt of USD $60 billion. The Export–Import Bank of the United States recently gave Sudan a $1 billion loan.
January 26 – General Abdel-Fattah Burhan and Minister of Defence Yassin Ibrahim meet with Israeli Intelligence Minister Eli Cohen in Khartoum.
January (date unknown) – Islamist Sheikh Muhammed Al-Amin Ismail condemns The Creation of Adam by Italian Renaissance artist Michelangelo, displayed in a history book, as “heresy and atheism”. The book has been withdrawn from the curriculum.
February 8 – Prime Minister Abdalla Hamdok announces a new Cabinet including Gibril Ibrahim as finance minister and ministers from the Sudan Revolutionary Front.
February 10 – The new Cabinet is sworn in.
February 21 – The central bank devalues Sudanese currency. The previous official rate was previous official rate of 55 pounds per U.S. dollar, and the new official rate is 375 pounds to the U.S. dollar.

March and April
March 1 – The USS Winston S. Churchill docks in Port Sudan one day after a Russian Admiral Grigorovich-class frigate docks there.
March 3 – Ten people are killed and 32 wounded in ethnic violence in western Darfur.
March 6 – Egyptian president Abdel Fattah el-Sisi meets with General Al-Burhan, Prime Minister Hamdok, and General Dagal in Khartoum.
March 26 – Sudan settles its debt with the World Bank, making it eligible for USD $2 billion in grants from the International Development Association.
March 28 – The government and Sudan People's Liberation Movement-North (SPLM-N) reach an agreement paving the way for peace negotiations between the two sides.

May and June 
 23 June - Sudan calls on the United Nations Security Council to meet and discuss on the Grand Ethiopian Renaissance Dam dispute.

July and August 
 8 August - Sudan recalls its ambassador to Ethiopia following Ethiopia's decision to reject mediation offer on the war in Tigray.
 12 August - Sudanese Foreign Minister Mariam al-Mahdi stated that the government would hand over former Sudanese ruler Omar al-Bashir to the International Criminal Court. He was accused of war crimes for the war in Darfur.

Rest of year
 December : Mine collapse kills at least 32 in Kordofan.

Deaths 
 January 1 – Abdul Hakim Al-Taher, director and actor (b. 1949).
February 8 – Malik Badri, 88, psychologist.
February 10 – Ibrahim Othman Ibrahim Idris, 60, ex-detainee (Guantanamo Bay detention camp).

See also 

COVID-19 pandemic in Africa
Grand Ethiopian Renaissance Dam
International Conference on the Great Lakes Region
Israel–Sudan normalization agreement

References

External links

Viewpoint: Why Ethiopia and Sudan have fallen out over al-Fashaga (Alex De Waal - Africa analyst, BBC News, January 2, 2021) 

2021 in Sudan
2020s in Sudan
Years of the 21st century in Sudan
Sudan
Sudan